Marko Vranić (Serbian Cyrillic: Марко Вранић; born 14 April 1978) is a Serbian footballer who played as a defender.

References

1978 births
Living people
Footballers from Belgrade
Serbian footballers
FK Zemun players
Association football defenders